Clarence Joseph Esser (March 27, 1921June 1, 2009) was a professional American football end in the National Football League for the Chicago Cardinals in 1947. He played at the collegiate level at the University of Wisconsin–Madison.

References

1921 births
2009 deaths
Sportspeople from Madison, Wisconsin
Players of American football from Wisconsin
American football defensive ends
Wisconsin Badgers football players
Chicago Cardinals players